Estadio Miguel Grau is a multi-use stadium in Piura, Peru, built in 1958.  It is currently used by football team Atlético Grau. Throughout the years the stadium has undergone many renovations, most recently for the Copa America 2004. For this international competition, the stadium capacity was raised to 25,500. It was also used to host several games in the 2005 FIFA U-17 World Championship, in which artificial turf and a new electronic scoreboard were installed.

External links
Entry in World Stadiums 

Sports venues completed in 1958
Football venues in Peru
Copa América stadiums
Estadio Miguel Grau
1958 establishments in Peru